Heckmondwike bus station (also known as Heckmondwike Hub) is a bus station in Heckmondwike, England.

History 
Plans to build a bus station in Heckmondwike were first considered in 2008, however, the project was delayed due to owners refusing to vacate offices on the proposed site, and the subsequent recession and budget cuts. Revised plans were approved by the council in April 2014. Work on the bus station finally began in October 2014, on a site that had previously been vacant for some time. The bus station opened on 25 April 2015.

Facilities 
The bus station has four stances, live departure information, sheltered bicycle parking, and covered waiting areas.

Future 
Plans to improve the bus station were announced in August 2020. The work will include adding two extra bus departure stands, baby changing facilities, an accessible toilet and an indoor waiting room.

References 

Bus stations in West Yorkshire
2015 establishments in England
Buildings and structures completed in 2015
Heckmondwike